Remagen station is on the Left Rhine line in the city of Remagen in the German state of Rhineland-Palatinate. It is classified by Deutsche Bahn as a category 4 station. The station is served by regular regional services as well as Intercity and EuroCity services. It is also the starting point of the Ahr Valley Railway (Ahrtalbahn).

History 
The Left Rhine line from Cologne to Bonn was extended to Rolandseck in 1856 and through Remagen to Koblenz in 1858. The Remagen station building was built in 1860. It has been the beginning and end of the Ahr Valley Railway since 17 September 1880. The station was rehabilitated in the 1930s. Further renovation work was carried out in 2007 and 2008. It has been served by the private railway company trans regio since 14 December 2008.

Structure 

Remagen station has an entrance building, in which a DB ticket office and ticket machines are located. There are food vending machines on platform tracks 2 and 3 and in the reception building. In the course of renovation work in 2008, the platform roofs were renewed and new LCD destination displays were erected. Each platform has a lift, making them accessible for wheelchairs. Platform track 5 is used only for the Ahr Valley Railway, operated as the Rhein-Ahr-Bahn towards Ahrbrück.

A special feature is the station’s cast-iron portico, which is not anchored to the building, but rather stands on its own. The station hall was originally in Bonn and it was removed during the construction of Bonn railway station in 1883/84 and re-erected in Remagen. The hall is thus older than the station itself.

Since 21 March 2009, Remagen station has had a DB service store with access from the main platform and the station building.

Operations 
The platforms tracks of Remagen railway station are operated as follows:

Train services
The station is served by the following services:

Eurocity services (EC 32) Münster - Düsseldorf - Cologne - Koblenz - Mainz - Mannheim - Stuttgart – München – Salzburg – Villach – Klagenfurt
Eurocity services (EC 32) Münster - Düsseldorf - Cologne - Koblenz - Mainz - Mannheim - Stuttgart – Lindau - Innsbruck
Intercity services (IC 32) (Berlin - Hanover -) Dortmund - Essen - Düsseldorf - Cologne - Koblenz - Mainz - Mannheim - Stuttgart - Munich
Intercity services (IC 35) Norddeich - Emden - Rheine - Münster - Düsseldorf - Cologne - Koblenz - Mainz - Mannheim - Karlsruhe - Konstanz
Intercity services (IC 35) Norddeich - Emden - Rheine - Münster - Düsseldorf - Cologne - Koblenz - Mainz - Mannheim - Stuttgart
Intercity services (IC 55) Magdeburg - Hanover - Dortmund - Essen - Düsseldorf - Cologne - Koblenz - Mainz - Mannheim - Stuttgart - Oberstdorf
Regional services  Rhein-Express Emmerich - Oberhausen - Duisburg - Düsseldorf - Cologne - Bonn - Remagen - Koblenz
Local services  MittelrheinBahn Cologne - Bonn - Remagen - Andernach - Koblenz
Local services  Rhein-Ahr-Bahn Bonn - Remagen - Bad Neuenahr - Dernau - Ahrbrück
Local services  Ahrtalbahn Remagen - Bad Neuenahr - Dernau (- Kreuzberg)

References

External links

Railway stations in Rhineland-Palatinate
Railway stations in Germany opened in 1858
Ahrweiler (district)
1858 establishments in Prussia
Remagen